Cape Christmas is an abrupt rock cape which rises to , marking the north side of the entrance to Wüst Inlet, on the east coast of Palmer Land. It was discovered and photographed from the air in December 1940 by the United States Antarctic Service; during 1947 it was photographed from the air by the Ronne Antarctic Research Expedition under Finn Ronne, who in conjunction with the Falkland Islands Dependencies Survey (FIDS) charted it from the ground. It was so named by the FIDS because the joint party in 1947 spent Christmas Day, December 25, in this vicinity.

References
 

Headlands of Palmer Land